Castruccio Castracane degli Antelminelli (Urbino, 21 September 1779 – Rome, 22 February 1852) was an Italian clergyman, who was made a cardinal by Pope Gregory XVI in the consistory of 15 April 1833.

References

External links
His entry on www.catholichierarchy.org. 

1779 births
1852 deaths
19th-century Italian cardinals
Major Penitentiaries of the Apostolic Penitentiary
Cardinals created by Pope Gregory XVI